Panikos Krystallis (born 1 July 1938) is a Cypriot former football player and manager who played as a forward. Apart from a stint abroad with Greek club AEK Athens, he spent his entire career in his home country of Cyprus with Apollon Limassol and AEL Limassol. At international level, he made 20 appearances for the Cyprus national team scoring four goals.

Early life
Krystallis was born on in Amiantos and grew up in Limassol. His name was Panikos Anastasiou, but subsequently, in an affidavit, he changed it to Krystallis to honor his mother, Krystalla, who raised him alone as his father had died very early.

Club career
Krystallis started his football career in 1953, when he joined the academies of AEL Limassol under Argyris Gavalas and in 1955 he was promoted to the men's team. He won two consecutive Cypriot First Division titles in 1954 and 1955. In 1956, after he fell out with the management of the club, he was punished and transferred to the cross-town rivals and second division side, Apollon Limassol, where he had his best years as a striker. With Apollon he started playing after his suspension ended in and contributed to the promotion of the team to the First Division, while in the period 19601 he became the top scorer in the Cypriot Championship with 26 goals. In 1961 he was invited by Omonia, alongside Vassos Aristotelous, to strengthen the team in friendly games they played in Bulgaria and the Soviet Union. The return to Cyprus would mark the end of the cooperation with Omonoia, as AEK Athens were interested to include Krystallis in their roster. The advanced, for Cypriot standards at the time, Greek Championship, was a "lifetime dream" of all Cypriot footballers and thus Krystallis, for the huge for the time amount of 5,000 British Pounds, along with his compatriot Dimitris Zagylos of Anorthosis Famagusta, were transferred to AEK in August 1961.

Although Krystallis found in front of him players such as Kostas Nestoridis and Mimis Papaioannou, he managed to impress several times with his appearances. On 2 May 1962, AEK faced Bolton in a friendly match in Nea Filadelfeia. The victory of AEK by 4–2 was largely based on the performance of Krystallis, who was also anointed scorer along with Stamatiadis and Nestoridis who scored twice. The people of Bolton were interested in his acquisition which never took place as the difference of 17,000 pounds that AEK asked for and 12,000 pounds offered by the English was bridged. In 1963 he won with the yellow blacks the Championship after a play-off match against Panathinaikos In the summer of 1963, the president of Apollon Limassol, Emilios Michaelidis, hastily arrived in Athens and almost orders Krystallis to return to Cyprus and Apollon, who were in decline and a possible relegation to the second was anything but a Government choice in Cyprus. Thus, Krystallis left AEK Athens.

In his second spell in Apollon he led the club to the conquest of two consecutive Cups in 1966 and 1967, while he won the second cup as a player-coach of the team. He was the player-coach of Apollo from 1967 to 1969. In 1969 he was kicked out of the team after a disagreement with the coach. In 1970 he returned to AEL Limassol at the suggestion of Nikos Solomonidis. In the period 1972-1974 he was a player-coach of AEL, where he finished his career as a fooballer.

International career
During his career, he was capped 19 times by the Cyprus national team scoring four goals.

Managerial career
After his playing career was over, Krystallis coached various clubs including AEL Limassol, Apollon Limassol, Evagoras Paphos and the Cyprus national football team.

Personal life
On 15 July 2021, in a friendly match of AEK Athens and Apollon Limassol at Athens Olympic Stadium, he was jointly honored by both clubs. In recent years he has been engaged in painting.

Honours

As a player

AEL Limassol
Cypriot First Division: 1954–55, 1955–56

Apollon Limassol
Cypriot Second Division: 1956–57
Cypriot Cup: 1965–66

AEK Athens
Alpha Ethniki: 1962–63

As a player-manager

Apollon Limassol
Cypriot Cup: 1966–67

References

External links

Living people
1938 births
Cypriot footballers
Association football forwards
Cyprus international footballers
Cypriot First Division players
Super League Greece players
AEL Limassol players
Apollon Limassol FC players
AEK Athens F.C. players
Cypriot football managers
AEL Limassol managers
Apollon Limassol FC managers
Cyprus national football team managers
Evagoras Paphos managers
Expatriate footballers in Greece
Cypriot expatriate sportspeople in Greece
Cypriot expatriate footballers
People from Limassol District